The Bureau of Mines (BOM) is the government agency of the Ministry of Economic Affairs of the Republic of China (Taiwan).

History
On 11 February 1970, the Taiwan Provincial Government merged the Coal Industry Regulatory Committee, Second Section of Reconstruction Department governing mine safety and Second Division of Industry and Mine Inspection Committee overseeing inspection of mine safety into Taiwan Provincial Bureau of Mines. On 1 July 1999, it was put under the Ministry of Economic Affairs as Bureau of Mines.

Organizational structures
 Mine administration
 Mine safety
 Mine assistance
 Soil and rock divisions
 Eastern district office
 Secretary
 Accounting
 Personnel and civil service ethics offices

Transportation
The headquarter office is accessible within walking distance west of Shandao Temple Station of Taipei Metro.

Directors
 Chu Ming-chao (朱明昭) (- 13 June 2017)
 Hsu Ching-wen (徐景文) (13 June 2017 -)

See also
 Ministry of Economic Affairs (Taiwan)
 Mining in Taiwan

References

1970 establishments in Taiwan
Executive Yuan
Mining in Taiwan
Government of Taiwan